The X Factor was an Australian television reality music competition, based on the original UK series, to find new singing talent; the winner of which received a Sony Music Australia recording contract. The seventh season premiered on the Seven Network on 13 September 2015 and concluded on 24 November 2015. Luke Jacobz returned as the host of the show. Dannii Minogue was the only judge from the previous season who returned, while Redfoo, Ronan Keating and Natalie Bassingthwaighte were replaced by former judge Guy Sebastian, as well as new judges James Blunt and Chris Isaak. The winner was Cyrus Villanueva and his winner's single "Stone" was released after the final. He was mentored by Isaak, who won as mentor for the first time.

Open auditions in front of the show's producers took place in 13 cities between January and March 2015. The successful auditionees chosen by the producers were then invited back to the last set of auditions that took place in front of the judges and a live audience in June 2015. The next round was bootcamp, which for the first time on The X Factor Australia incorporated the five seat challenge, where each act performed in front of the judges and a live audience to earn a place on one of the five seats in their category. Following bootcamp was the super home visits round in London, where each judge reduced their five acts to three, with help from guest mentors Simon Cowell, Olly Murs and Rita Ora. For the first time on The X Factor Australia, instead of travelling to four different locations around the world, the super home visits for each category were all held together in the same location.

The live shows began on 27 September 2015. They returned to Monday and Tuesday nights as previously seen in seasons 3 and 4. This was a change of format from seasons 2, 5 and 6, in which the live shows were broadcast on Sunday and Monday nights.

Judges

On 25 April 2015, Ronan Keating confirmed in an interview with The Sunday Telegraph that he would not be returning for season 7 as he wanted to focus on his music career. He said, "I've had five great years working on an amazing show with a brilliant team of people. But I'm working on a new solo album and different projects so I can't make it back this year sadly." Natalie Bassingthwaighte announced her departure on her Twitter account on 29 April 2015. On 1 May 2015, Redfoo announced on his Facebook page that he would also not be returning as he wanted to focus on other projects including a new album. Dannii Minogue was the only judge from season 6 who returned.

On 3 May 2015, it was confirmed that Guy Sebastian would be returning to the judging panel, after a two-year absence, as Redfoo's replacement, while James Blunt and Chris Isaak would be replacing Keating and Bassingthwaighte. Isaak said, "It is going to be surreal to be on the show as a judge after having watched so many episodes as a fan. I know it's a show with a history of articulate, intelligent judges, and I know they wanted to change that up so they called me." Blunt previously appeared on season 6 as a guest mentor for Minogue's Groups category during the home visits round.

Selection process

Auditions
Open auditions in front of the show's producers took place in 13 cities and ran from 31 January 2015 to 10 March 2015. Online auditions were also held for those who could not attend the open auditions. The auditionees chosen by the producers were then invited back to the last set of auditions that took place in front of the judges and a live studio audience. These auditions were filmed at the Qantas Credit Union Arena in Sydney on 4, 5, 6 and 7 June 2015 and Hisense Arena in Melbourne on 12, 13 and 14 June 2015.

Bootcamp and five seat challenge
The bootcamp round of the competition was held at the Sydney Olympic Park. Filming began on 8 July 2015. The episodes with a live audience were filmed on 10 and 11 July 2015. Before bootcamp started, the judges cut half of the 100 successful acts from auditions and only 48 acts remained (12 in each category). At the beginning of the bootcamp round, each judge found out which category they would be mentoring. Isaak was given the Boys, Blunt was given the Over 25s, Sebastian was given the Groups and Minogue was given the Girls. For the first time on The X Factor Australia, bootcamp incorporated the five seat challenge, where each act performed in front of the judges and a live audience to earn a place on one of the five seats in their category. After each performance, the mentor for that category decided if that act deserved to take a seat as one of their top five to go through to the super home visits.

If all five seats were filled for each category and a remaining act performed better than those seated, the mentor for that category had the option of swapping an act out. Contestants Panda and Chan were swapped for Cyrus Villanueva and Big T in the Boys category, Aaron Taylor and Mama Julz were swapped for Roshani Priddis and Dan Hamill in the Over 25s category, and couple duo Luke & Tannah were swapped for Lazy J & Big Guy in the Groups category. In the Girls category, Carla Wehbe and Chloe Papandrea were swapped for Maddison Milewski and Shannon Hancock. However, Hancock was then swapped for Michaela Baranov.

The 20 successful acts were:
Boys: Big T, Jimmy Davis, Michael Duchesne, Andrew Lambrou, Cyrus Villanueva
Girls: Michaela Baranov, Georgia Denton, Emilia Kelberg, Maddison Milewski, Mahalia Simpson
Over 25s: Louise Adams, Natalie Conway, Gazele, Dan Hamill, Roshani Priddis
Groups: The Fisher Boys, In Stereo, Jess & Matt, Lazy J & Big Guy, Paris Inc.

Super home visits
For the first time on The X Factor Australia, instead of travelling to four different locations around the world, the super home visits for each category were all held together in the same location. The first episode of the super home visits round was filmed in London on 25 July 2015. Each act performed one song to their mentor and guest mentors. Minogue and Sebastian were assisted by Simon Cowell and Olly Murs, and Isaak and Blunt were assisted by Cowell and Rita Ora. After the performances, the judges along with their guest mentors narrowed down the acts to three each. The Girls and Groups categories travelled to Abu Dhabi to find out which of their acts made it to the live shows, while the Boys and Over 25s categories remained in London.

Acts 
Key:
 – Winner
 – Runner-Up

Live shows

Results summary
Colour key
 Act in Team Dannii
 Act in Team Guy
 Act in Team Chris
 Act in Team James

  – Act in the bottom two and had to perform again in the final showdown
  – Act was in the bottom three but received the fewest votes and was immediately eliminated
  – Act received the fewest public votes and was immediately eliminated (no final showdown)

 Sebastian was not required to vote as there was already a majority.

Live show details

Week 1 (27/29 September)
 Theme: Launch Party
 Group performance: "Gold Dust"
 Celebrity performers: Jessica Mauboy ("This Ain't Love") and Justin Bieber ("What Do You Mean?")

 Judges' vote to eliminate
 Minogue: Dan Hamill – backed her own act, Georgia Denton.
 Blunt: Georgia Denton – backed his own act, Dan Hamill.
 Isaak: Dan Hamill – wanted to see what Denton was going to do next.
 Sebastian: Dan Hamill – thought Denton still had more to deliver.

 Notes
 This week's live performance show aired on Sunday night due to the Seven Network's coverage of the 2015 Brownlow Medal on Monday night.

Week 2 (5/6 October)
 Theme: Decades Challenge
 Group performance: "Up"
 Celebrity performers: 
Monday: One Direction ("Drag Me Down")
Tuesday: Ellie Goulding ("On My Mind") and Robbie Williams ("Angels")

 Judges' vote to eliminate
 Minogue:  The Fisher Boys – felt that Jess and Matt has develop more.
 Blunt:  The Fisher Boys – felt that The Fisher Boys went too far that week.
 Isaak: The Fisher Boys – thought Jess & Matt had the X Factor.
 Sebastian was not required to vote as there was already a majority and did not say how he would have voted as both acts were in his category.

 Notes
 A video of One Direction's performance of "Drag Me Down" from their On the Road Again Tour was shown on Monday night.
 On 17 October 2015, the performances of three contestants entered the ARIA Singles Chart. Cyrus Villanueva's performance of "Wicked Game" debuted at number 6, Mahalia Simpson's performance of "Hello" debuted at number 88, and Louise Adams' performance of "People Help the People" debuted at number 91.

Week 3 (12/13 October)
 Theme: Top 10 Hits
 Group performance: "Rather Be"
 Celebrity performers: Jess Glynne ("Don't Be So Hard on Yourself"), Chris Isaak ("Please Don't Call"), and Little Mix ("Love Me Like You")

 Judges' vote to eliminate
 Isaak: Mahalia Simpson – backed his own act, Jimmy Davis.
 Minogue: Jimmy Davis – backed her own act, Mahalia Simpson.
 Blunt: Jimmy Davis – felt that Simpson was fantastic despite being a threat to the contestants in his category.
 Sebastian: Jimmy Davis – felt that Simpson had more magical performances in the live shows.

Notes
 For the first time in the show's history, this week's live decider featured a double elimination.
 For the second time in the show's history, this week's live decider featured a bottom three. However, one act was immediately eliminated while the other two faced off in the final showdown before the judges' votes as usual.
 On 24 October 2015, the performances of two contestants entered the ARIA Singles Chart. Jess & Matt's performance of "Do You Remember" debuted at number 53 and Cyrus Villanueva's performance of "Hold Back the River" debuted at number 100.

Week 4 (19/20 October)
 Theme: Rock
 Group performance: "Mickey" / "Shake It Off"
 Celebrity performers: Conrad Sewell ("Who You Lovin") and Adam Lambert ("Another Lonely Night")

 Judges' vote to eliminate
 Blunt: In Stereo – complimented In Stereo's final showdown performance but felt it was "too little too late".
 Isaak: In Stereo – gave no reason, although stated that the final showdown performances were close.
 Minogue: In Stereo – felt In Stereo were worse that week.
 Sebastian was not required to vote as there was already a majority and did not say how he would have voted as both acts were in his category.

Week 5 (26/27 October)
 Theme: Trailblazers
 Group performance: "Whip It!" with LunchMoney Lewis
 Celebrity performers: LunchMoney Lewis ("Bills"), Peking Duk ("Say My Name") and Nathaniel ("Always Be Yours")

 Judges' vote to eliminate
 Sebastian: Michaela Baranov – stated he was fond of Simpson.
 Isaak: Michaela Baranov – thought Simpson was suited to the show.
 Minogue: Mahalia Simpson – decided to vote for Simpson in an attempt to give Blunt an opportunity to send the result to deadlock.
 Blunt: Michaela Baranov – felt Simpson had improved more.

 Notes
 On 7 November 2015, the performances of two acts entered the ARIA Singles Chart. Jess & Matt's performance of "Dancing in the Dark" debuted at number 107 and Cyrus Villanueva's performance of "Rumour Has It" debuted at number 109.

Week 6 (2/3 November)
 Theme: Judge's Challenge
 Group performance: "Fight Song"
 Celebrity performers: Rachel Platten ("Stand by You"), Hozier ("From Eden") and Aston Merrygold ("Show Me")

 Judges' vote to eliminate
 Minogue: Natalie Conway – backed her own act, Mahalia Simpson.
 Blunt: Mahalia Simpson – backed his own act, Natalie Conway.
 Isaak: Natalie Conway – felt there was something "unique" about Simpson.
 Sebastian: Mahalia Simpson – could not decide and sent the result to deadlock.

With the acts in the bottom two receiving two votes each, the result was reverted to the earlier public vote for the first time this season. Conway received the fewest votes and was eliminated.

 Notes
 On 14 November 2015, the performances of three acts entered the ARIA Singles Chart. Jess & Matt's performance of "Stay" debuted at number 68, Cyrus Villanueva's performance of "Knockin' on Heaven's Door" debuted at number 80, and Louise Adams' performance of "You Don't Own Me" debuted at number 94.

Week 7: Quarter-Final (9/10 November)
 Mentor: Samantha Jade
 Group performance: "Time After Time"
 Celebrity performers: 
Monday: Marlisa Punzalan ("Forever Young")
Tuesday: Vance Joy ("Fire and the Flood") and Samantha Jade ("Shake That")

 Judges' vote to eliminate
 Isaak: Mahalia Simpson – backed his own act, Big T.
 Minogue: Big T – backed her own act, Mahalia Simpson.
 Sebastian: Big T – felt that Simpson was "ready as an artist".
 Blunt: Mahalia Simpson – felt that The X Factor "squashed" her artistry.

With the acts in the bottom two receiving two votes each, the result went to deadlock and reverted to the earlier public vote for the second week in a row. Simpson was eliminated as the act with the fewest public votes.

 Notes
 For the first time this season, there was no theme and each mentor picked any song they wanted for their remaining acts.
 On 21 November 2015, Jess & Matt's performance of "You're the One That I Want" debuted at number 30 on the ARIA Singles Chart.

Week 8: Semi-Final (16/17 November)
 Theme: Killer Tracks and Curveballs
 Group performance: "Que Sera" with Justice Crew
 Celebrity performers: 
Monday: One Direction ("Perfect")
Tuesday: Justice Crew ("Good Time"), Guy Sebastian ("Black & Blue") and Rob Thomas ("Hold on Forever")

 Judges' vote to send through to the Grand Final
 Isaak: Big T – backed his own act, Big T.
 Blunt: Louise Adams – backed his own act, Louise Adams.
 Sebastian: Louise Adams – felt that Adams was ready to "step off the stage and play a festival".
 Minogue: Big T – could not decide and sent the result to deadlock.

With the acts in the bottom two receiving two votes each, the result went to deadlock and reverted to the earlier public vote for the third week in a row. Adams advanced to the final as the act with the most public votes.

Notes
 A video of One Direction's performance of "Perfect" on The X Factor UK was shown on Monday night.

Week 9: Final (23/24 November)
23 November
Themes: Audition song; winner's song; grand final song
 Group performance: "What I Did for Love" (Top 3)

Jess & Matt received the fewest public votes and were automatically eliminated.

24 November
Theme: Best Song
Group performances:
"Lean On" (Top 12)
"You're Beautiful" (Top 12 with James Blunt)
"One" (Top 2)
 Celebrity performers: Jason Derulo ("Get Ugly"), Rudimental ("Lay It All on Me") and Kylie Minogue & Dannii Minogue ("100 Degrees")

Reception

Controversy and criticism
During the third live show on 12 October, controversy occurred between Minogue and Blunt after Minogue's contestant, Georgia Denton performed "I'll Be There" by Jackson 5. Blunt, Sebastian and Isaak felt the tune was not suited to her. Denton was eliminated on the live decider the following night in a special double elimination after receiving the fewest votes from the public. During the rock-themed fourth live show on 19 October, another controversy occurred when Blunt and Isaak got into a heated argument over Isaak's song choice for his contestant Cyrus Villanueva, who performed "It Ain't Over 'til It's Over" by Lenny Kravitz. Blunt felt that it was "a soul-funk song, not a rock song". Isaak did not appreciate Blunt's feedback towards him and said, "To hear James tell me what rock and roll is... I don't know what they pass as rock and roll at the disco in Ibiza, but that was rock and roll!" Isaak told Blunt to "shut up" several times.

More controversy occurred in the Judges' Challenge-themed week six live show when Big T performed "Locked Out of Heaven" by Bruno Mars as chosen by Minogue, but failed to impress the judges with his rendition of the song. Big T failed to find the correct key at the beginning of the song and was left deflated once the performance had ended. After the performance, Blunt criticized Big T by telling him that he was in danger of sounding like a "cruise ship" act. Big T's mentor Isaak then lost control and foul-mouthed at Blunt. The fight between Isaak and Blunt continued off-camera with Sebastian trying to calm them down.

Ratings
 Colour key:
  – Highest rating during the season
  – Lowest rating during the season

See also
Television in Australia

References

External links
 The X Factor at Yahoo!7

Season 7
2015 Australian television seasons
Australia 07